Manfred Srb (5 June 1941 – 8 January 2022) was an Austrian politician. A member of The Greens – The Green Alternative, he served in the Federal Council from 1986 to 1994. He died on 8 January 2022, at the age of 80.

References

1941 births
2022 deaths
People from Stockerau
The Greens – The Green Alternative politicians
Members of the National Council (Austria)